Surfing is a surface water sport in which the rider, referred to as a surfer, rides on the forward or deep face of a moving wave. Related activities include:
Bodyboarding, water sport using a bodyboard
Bodysurfing, riding a wave without the assistance of any buoyant device
Kitesurfing, propulsion with a power kite across a surface
Windsurfing, water sport combining surfing and sailing
Horse surfing, the act of surfing while being towed behind a horse.  

Surfing may also refer to:

Activities 
Channel surfing, quickly scanning through television channels
Crowd surfing, passing a person atop a crowd
Sea bathing, swimming in the ocean or sea
Shoulder surfing (computer security), social engineering technique
Waterboarding, a torture technique known as surfboarding prior to 2004
Web surfing, navigating the World Wide Web

Music 
"Surfin'" (song), song by the Beach Boys
"Surfin'" (Kid Cudi song), 2016
"Surfing", song by Mike Oldfield, from Light + Shade
Surfing, album by Megapuss

Other uses 
CouchSurfing, a hospitality and social networking service

See also 
 
 Surf (disambiguation)
 Surfer (disambiguation)